Just Say Yesterday was Sire Records' Volume 6 of Just Say Yes and was originally released on September 1, 1992  as a CD sampler.  It contained remixes and non-album tracks of artists on the label, most of which were considered new wave or modern rock (all would eventually fall under the genre alternative rock).

Track listing
 Nowhere Girl - B-Movie
 Kiss Me - Tin Tin
 Swear - Tim Scott
 Don't Tell Me - Blancmange
 One Step Beyond - Madness
 Ca Plane Pour Moi (This Life's for Me) - Plastic Bertrand
 Pop Muzik - M
 Kiss Kiss Bang Bang - Specimen
 Caught With the Meat in Your Mouth - Dead Boys
 Piss Factory - Patti Smith
 Somebody's Gonna Get Their Head Kicked in Tonight - The Rezillos
 Jump - Aztec Camera
 Cath - The Bluebells
 Teenage Kicks - The Undertones
 Memphis - Silicon Teens
 Warm Leatherette - The Normal

It is volume six in the Just Say Yes series of promotional compilations, of which each title was a variation on the 'Just Say' theme:

Just Say Yes Volume I: Just Say Yes (1987)
Just Say Yes Volume II: Just Say Yo (1988)
Just Say Yes Volume III: Just Say Mao (1989)
Just Say Yes Volume IV: Just Say Da (1990)
Just Say Yes Volume V: Just Say Anything (1991)
Just Say Yes Volume VII: Just Say Roe (1994)

References

1992 compilation albums
Alternative rock compilation albums
New wave compilation albums
Sire Records compilation albums